Joseph Carpenter may refer to:

Joseph Edwards Carpenter (1813–1885), English playwright and songwriter
Joseph Estlin Carpenter (1844–1927), Unitarian minister, principal of Manchester College, Oxford
Joe Carpenter (rugby union), English rugby union player
Joe Carpenter (R.O.D), fictional character in Japanese novel, Read or Die